The Loxford Park Speedway is a motorcycle speedway track located in the town of Loxford near  in New South Wales (NSW). It is home to the Kurri Kurri Speedway Club and the Kurri Cobras.

History
Construction of the  track commenced in 2008 with the speedway opening later that year giving NSW a second full-time motorcycle speedway (the other being the Gosford Speedway, though there are also other tracks including the Nepean Speedway in north west Sydney and the rarely used Newcastle Showgrounds). Loxford park also has a  junior track built on the infield of the main track with the junior track joining onto the main straight and sharing the start-finish line.

Loxford Park held its first championship meeting in 2010/11 when it hosted the New South Wales Solo Championship which saw reigning Australian Champion Chris Holder win his 5th NSW Championship in six years. Loxford Park then hosted the first of two rounds in the 2011/12 NSW Championship before being the sole host in 2012/13, 2013/14 and 2014/15.

In 2011, Loxford Park hosted the opening round of the four round Australian Solo Championship. It has hosted a round of the championship each year since 2011 and hosted the final round of the 2015 Australian Championship on 10 January. Both the final round and the championship were won by local (Newcastle) rider Jason Doyle. Loxford also hosted the 2012, 2013 and 2015 Australian Under-21 Championships. The speedway has also hosted the NSW Under-21 Championship.

The speedway hosts both solo and sidecar racing, as well as junior solos and sidecars. It hosted its first Australian Sidecar Championship in 2012, won by Darrin Treloar for a record 6th time and his passenger Simon Cohrs. The 2014 championship was also held at the speedway with NSW pair Grant Bond and Glen Cox winning their first national championship.

Loxford Park also hosts a round of the Sidecar Grand Slam series which often attracts the best riders and passengers from around Australia, New Zealand, the United States and the United Kingdom.

The junior speedway track has also hosted both the NSW and Australian Under-16 Championships. The 2012 Australian Under-16 Championship saw an all-NSW podium with Brady Kurtz defeating Jack Holder and Lawson Walters.

Loxford is also the site of the Todd Wiltshire Cup for junior solo riders. The cup is named for the former NSW and Australian champion who finished third in the 1990 World Championship. Wiltshire is generally on hand to award the placegetters with their trophies. The speedway also hosts the Jason Crump Invitational meeting each December on Boxing Day in honour of Australia's only triple Speedway World Champion.

Like a number of motorcycle speedway tracks, Loxford Park has an  through the turns for the safety of the riders.

Australian championships

Australian Solo Championship
 2011 – Round 1  Chris Holder (series winner – Chris Holder)
 2012 – Round 2  Chris Holder (series winner – Chris Holder)
 2013 – Round 3  Troy Batchelor (series winner – Troy Batchelor)
 2014 – Round 1  Jason Doyle (series winner – Chris Holder)
 2015 – Round 4  Jason Doyle (series winner – Jason Doyle)
 2016 – Round 1  Rohan Tungate (series winner – Brady Kurtz)
 2017 – Round 4  Brady Kurtz (series winner – Sam Masters)

Australian Under-21 Championship
 2012 –  Taylor Poole
 2013 –  Max Fricke
 2015 –  Max Fricke
 2017 –  Max Fricke

Australian Under-16 Championship
 2012 –  Brady Kurtz

Australian Sidecar Championship
 2012 –  Darrin Treloar /  Simon Cohrs
 2014 –  Darrin Treloar  /  Blake Cox

References

External links
 

Motorsport venues in New South Wales
Speedway venues in Australia